The Gen. George Cowles House, also known as the Solomon Cowles House, is a historic house at 130 Main Street in Farmington, Connecticut.  Built in 1803, it is a prominent local example of Federal style architecture in brick, built for a prominent local family.  The house was listed on the National Register of Historic Places on May 11, 1982.

Description and history
The George Cowles House is located on the northwest side of Main Street (Connecticut Route 10) in geographically central Farmington, between Smith Drive and Pearl Street.  It is a roughly square -story brick structure, four bays wide, with a side-gable roof and a rear two-story ell.  The main entrance is slightly recessed in the load-bearing brick wall, and is flanked by sidelight windows and topped by a semi-elliptical transom window.  The side elevation is notable for a pair of Palladian windows in the central bay, which are set higher than the flanking sash windows.  The south elevation, facing the garden, has as particularly elaborate Jeffersonian portico.

The house was built 1803 for George Cowles, around the time of his marriage, by his father Solomon, a wealthy merchant.  Both father and son were prominent in town affairs.  The son did not have the business acumen of the father, and lost the house in foreclosure to a wealthy relative.  Although a number of the building's owners subdivided its larger chambers to increase the number of bedrooms, these changes have generally been reversed.

See also
National Register of Historic Places listings in Hartford County, Connecticut

References

Houses on the National Register of Historic Places in Connecticut
National Register of Historic Places in Hartford County, Connecticut
Houses completed in 1803
Houses in Farmington, Connecticut
Historic district contributing properties in Connecticut